The Charlotte Crosby Experience is a British reality series broadcast on TLC. The series was centred around Charlotte Crosby travelling around the world and learning about different cultures, and was broadcast from 29 April to 27 May 2014.

Episodes

References

2010s British reality television series
2014 British television series debuts
2014 British television series endings
British travel television series
English-language television shows
Television shows set in Rajasthan
Television shows set in Manitoba
Television shows set in Tyne and Wear
Television shows set in Tokyo
TLC (TV network) original programming